A Single Man is a lost 1929 MGM silent comedy film directed by Harry Beaumont and starring Lew Cody. It is based on a 1911 Broadway stage play by Hubert Henry Davies, A Single Man.

Cast
 Lew Cody - Robin Worthington
 Aileen Pringle - Mary Hazeltine
 Marceline Day - Maggie
 Edward Nugent - Dickie
 Kathlyn Williams - Mrs. Cottrell
 Aileen Manning - Mrs. Farley

References

External links
 
 
 Australian daybill long poster
  more accessible version of poster
 French lobby poster(Wayback)

1929 films
American silent feature films
Lost American films
American films based on plays
Metro-Goldwyn-Mayer films
Films directed by Harry Beaumont
1929 comedy films
Silent American comedy films
American black-and-white films
1929 lost films
Lost comedy films
Films with screenplays by F. Hugh Herbert
1920s American films
1920s English-language films